Goodbye My Love was a South Korean television drama series that aired from September 1 to October 21, 1999 with 16 episodes.

Storyline 
Ahn Jae-wook stars as Min-soo, an aspiring businessman who once saved the life of his friend Gi-tae (Jung Joon-ho). Afterwards, Gi-tae's wealthy father hires Min-soo to keep Gi-tae out of trouble. Min-soo later meets Yeon-joo (Kim Hee-sun), a factory worker with financial problems.

Cast 
 Kim Hee-sun as Seo Yeon-joo
 Ahn Jae-wook as Chang Min-soo
 Jung Joon-ho as Choi Gi-tae
 Lee Hye-young as Im Jung-ae (Yeon-joo's roommate)
 Lee Tae-ran as Choi Hee-jung (Gi-tae's sister)
 Yoo Jun-sang as Song Dae-ho (Min-soo's friend)
 Joo Hyun as Choi Hyun-su (Gi-tae's father)
 Lee Yoon-sung
 Choi Jae-won
 Seol Soo-jin
 Kwon Yun-woo
 Kim Min-jung
 Song Il-kook (cameo, episodes 1 & 10)

References

External links 
 Goodbye My Love official MBC website
 Goodbye My Love at KoreanWiz
 

MBC TV television dramas
AZN Television original programming
2000s American television series
1999 South Korean television series debuts
1999 South Korean television series endings
South Korean romance television series